Rangli Rangliot is a village  in the Rangli Rangliot CD block in the Darjeeling Sadar subdivision of the Darjeeling district in the state of West Bengal, India.

Geography

Location                        

Area overview
The map alongside shows the eastern portion of the Darjeeling Himalayan hill region and a small portion of the terai region in its eastern and southern fringes, all of it in the Darjeeling district. In the Darjeeling Sadar subdivision 61.00% of the total population lives in the rural areas and 39.00% of the population lives in the urban areas. In the Kurseong subdivision 58.41% of the total population lives in the rural areas and 41.59% lives in the urban areas. There are 78 tea gardens/ estates (the figure varies slightly according to different sources), in the district, producing and largely exporting Darjeeling tea. It engages a large proportion of the population directly/ indirectly. Some tea gardens were identified in the 2011 census as census towns or villages. Such places are marked in the map as CT (census town) or R (rural/ urban centre). Specific tea estate pages are marked TE.

Note: The map alongside presents some of the notable locations in the subdivision. All places marked in the map are linked in the larger full screen map.

Demographics
According to the 2011 Census of India, Rangli Rangliot Tea Garden had a total population of 2,616 of which 1,230 (47%) were males and 1,386 (53%) were females. There were 181 persons in the age range of 0 to 6 years. The total number of literate people in Rangli Rangliot was 1,969 (75.27% of the population over 6 years).

Civic Administration

Police station
Rangli Rangliot police station has jurisdiction over the Rangli Rangliot CD block.

Economy
Rangli Rangliot Tea Garden of Duncan Industries Limited was awarded ISO:9002 certification from Det Norske Veritas.

As of 2020, Rangli Rangliot Tea Garden has been facing numerous problems for the past two years or so.

Education
Jinglam Uday Higher Secondary School is an English-medium  coeducational institution established in 1968. It has facilities for teaching from class V to class XII.

Healthcare
Takdah Rural Hospital, with 30 beds at Takdah, is the major government medical facility in the Rangli Rangliot CD block.

References

Villages in Darjeeling district